Mänttä-Vilppula (also ) is a town and municipality of Finland. The municipalities of Mänttä and Vilppula were consolidated into a single municipality on January 1, 2009. It is located in the Pirkanmaa region.

The municipality is unilingually Finnish.

Neighbouring municipalities are Keuruu, Juupajoki, Jämsä, Ruovesi and Virrat.

Major lakes in the area include the lakes Ruovesi, Kuorevesi and Keurusselkä.

People
 Eero Rahola (1897–1975)
 Lydia Wideman (1920-2019)
 Veikko Ennala (1922–1991)
 Marjatta Moulin (1926–2018)
 Keijo Liinamaa (1929–1980)
 Risto Siltanen (born 1958)
 Laura Huhtasaari (born 1979)
 Emmi (Finnish singer) (born 1979)
 Pekka Koskela (born 1982)
 Miikka "Lord Satanachia" Ojala (Finnish black metal vocalist) (born 1974)

See also 
 Vilppula railway station
 Finnish national road 58

References

External links

 Town of Mänttä-Vilppula – Official website 

 
Cities and towns in Finland
Populated places established in 2009